Brea Olinda Unified School District is the school district serving the City of Brea in Orange County, California, United States.  It also serves portions of the nearby cities of Fullerton, Yorba Linda and La Habra.

The school district consists of:
6 elementary schools
1 junior high school
1 high school
1 continuation high school
1 Online Academy (K-6)

History
In 1994, the school district had the lowest dropout rate of all the districts in Orange County at 13 students, making up 0.5% of the district's students.

District Leadership

Board of Trustees
The Brea Olinda Unified School District has a five-member board.  Each member is elected to serve a four-year term of office.  The current trustees are:

Deana Miller - Board President
Paul Ruiz - Board Vice President/Clerk
Chris Becerra, Ed.D. - Board Trustee
Carrie Flanders - Board Trustee
Gail Lyons - Board Trustee
The Board of Trustees is responsible for policy making for the school district.

Deana Miller is the 2023 president and leader.

The Superintendent
The Board of Trustees appoints a professional to oversee the day-to-day operations of the school district.  The current Superintendent of Schools is Brinda C. Leon, who acts as the chief executive officer of the school district as well as the Secretary to the Board of Trustees.  She has three Assistant Superintendents: Dr. Valerie Rogers for Human Resources, Rick Champion for Business Services, and Dr. Phil D'Agostino for Educational Services.

Schools
Brea Olinda Unified consists of 10 schools: six elementary schools, one junior high school, one high school, one continuation high school and one online academy (K-6).

Elementary schools
Arovista Elementary School
Brea Country Hills Elementary School
Falcon Academy of Science and Technology
Laurel Elementary Magnet School of Innovation & Career Exploration
Mariposa Elementary School
Olinda Elementary School

Online Elementary School
Brea Online Academy

Junior High School
Brea Junior High School

High School
Brea Olinda High School

Continuation High School
Brea Canyon High School

District Achievements

California Distinguished Schools
Arovista Elementary School
Brea Country Hills Elementary School
Brea Online Academy
Mariposa Elementary School
Olinda Elementary School
Brea Junior High School
Brea Olinda High School

California Gold Ribbon Schools
Arovista Elementary School
Laurel Elementary Magnet School of Innovation & Career Exploration
Falcon Academy of Science & Technology

Title I Academic Achievement Award (CDE)
Arovista Elementary School
Laurel Elementary Magnet School of Innovation & Career Exploration

National Blue Ribbon Schools of Excellence
Brea Olinda High School
Olinda Elementary School

Golden Bell Award
Brea Olinda Unified School District (Career Technical Education)
Laurel Magnet School Career Exploration Program (Community Schools Through Partnerships & Collaboration)

Model Continuation School
Brea Canyon High School

API Scores
Eight of Brea Olinda's nine schools are now over 800 with their API scores.

Orange County Teachers of the Year
Jeff Sink, Brea Olinda High School (1998)
Scott Malloy, Brea Olinda High School (2000)

California Teacher of the Year
Scott Malloy, Brea Olinda High School (2000)

Athletic Achievements

National Championships
Brea Olinda High School Girls Basketball, 1994 (USA Today), 2009 (MaxPreps)

California State Championships
Brea Olinda High School Girls Basketball, 1989, 1991, 1992, 1993, 1994, 1998, 1999, 2000, 2009

CIF Championships
Brea Olinda High School Football, 1959, 1961, 1962, 1963 (A-Division)
Brea Olinda High School Boys Soccer, 1986, 2001
Brea Olinda High School Girls Basketball, 1986, 1989, 1990, 1991, 1992, 1993, 1994, 1995, 1996, 1997, 1998, 1999, 2001, 2004, 2006
Brea Olinda High School Cross Country, 2006
Brea Olinda High School Girls Swimming, 2001, 2002
Brea Olinda High School Boys Swimming 1988

CIF Southern Section Championships
Brea Olinda High School Wildcat Football, 2001
Brea Olinda High School Girls Basketball, 2007, 2009

Brea Education Foundation

History
The non-profit Brea Education Foundation (BEF), a community of parents, neighbors, and business leaders, was activated in 2005 to support all students in the Brea Olinda Unified School District (BOUSD). In these times of shrinking school budgets, the foundation is focusing on funding three main areas: technology, science and the arts.

Board of Directors
Ric Clough, Chair
Diana Maldonado, Co-Chair
Abhishek Tiwari, Secretary
Andrew Todd, Treasurer
Paul Ruiz, School Board Representative 
Shirley Lee
Lori Sherman
Brandie Runner
Nicole Colon
Brinda Leon, Advisor
</ref>

References and notes

See also
Brea Olinda High School
Brea, California
List of school districts in Orange County, California

External links
 
 
  
 
 

School districts in Orange County, California
Brea, California
Fullerton, California
La Habra, California
Yorba Linda, California